Charles Otis Gill (March 4, 1868 – June 2, 1959) was an American Congregationalist clergyman and college football player and coach. With Gifford Pinchot he co-authored two influential books on the state of rural churches in the United States.

Gill played football at Yale University from 1885 to 1889.  He was captain of the Yale team and was on the first College Football All-America Team in 1889. Gill served as the head football coach at the University of California, Berkeley, in 1894, and for the New Hampshire football team in 1908, compiling a career college football coaching record of 1–8–2.

Early life and college career
Born in Walpole, Massachusetts, on March 4, 1868, Gill graduated from Yale in 1889, where he was a member of Skull and Bones.  He played football at Yale from 1885 to 1889.  In 1888 the team went undefeated and was not scored upon.  In 1889, Gill was captain of the team under coach Walter Camp and that year Yale scored 665 points while only giving up 31 points to their opponents.  That year, Caspar Whitney selected Gill and teammates Amos Alonzo Stagg and Pudge Heffelfinger for the first ever College Football All-America Team.

Minister, missionary, author
In addition to his accomplishments on the gridiron for Yale, Gill attended the Yale Divinity School from 1889 to 1890, then the Union Theological Seminary in New York City from 1892 to 1894, where he received his graduate degree and was ordained as a minister in the Congregational Church on July 25, 1894.  He served as pastor of the Westmore, Vermont, Congregational Church in 1894 and 1895 and then as a foreign missionary for the Presbyterian Church in Peking, China, from 1895 to 1997.  He returned to Vermont and served in East Fairfield, Vermont (1897–1898), Westmore, Vermont (1898–1902), Jericho, Vermont (1902–1904), West Lebanon, New Hampshire (1904–1906), and Hartland, Vermont (1906–1909).  Remaining in Harland, he collaborated with his Yale football teammate Gifford Pinchot in writing The Country Church - The Decline Of Its Influence and The Remedy published by Macmillan Company in 1913.  This led to his appointment as the Secretary of the Committee on Church & Country Life, Social Service Commission, Federal Council of Churches, in Columbus, Ohio, from 1913 to 1919.  In that capacity he wrote a second book with Pinchot, Six Thousand Country Churches, published by MacMillan in 1919.  While in Ohio, he was also Secretary of the Ohio Rural Life Association, a member of the Commission on Interchurch Cooperation, and Supervisor of rural church survey work for the Interchurch World Movement.

He returned to Vermont as pastor in Hartland until his retirement in 1929, when he relocated to Waterford, Vermont, and took up farming.  He remained in Waterford until his death on June 2, 1959.

Head coaching record

Notes

References

External links
 
 

1868 births
1959 deaths
19th-century players of American football
All-American college football players
American football tackles
American Congregationalist ministers
California Golden Bears football coaches
New Hampshire Wildcats football coaches
Union Theological Seminary (New York City) alumni
Yale Bulldogs football players
Yale Divinity School alumni
People from Walpole, Massachusetts
Players of American football from Massachusetts
Coaches of American football from Massachusetts